European Cartridge Research Association (ECRA) is a nonprofit organization which aims to promote interest and knowledge about ammunition of all types and forms. The organization was founded in 1965 under the name European Cartridge Collectors Club by the Belgian Emile Timmermans, and later changed name to the European Cartridge Research Association. While ECRA consists of European member associations, it also has individual members from outside Europe.

History 
The founder of ECRA, Emile Timmermans, had started collecting in 1945, and in 1964 wrote a letter to 10 other collectors in Germany, England, France and Switzerland where he described his ideas, whereupon he received 20 enthusiastic answers. On 1 January 1965, the first edition of the bulletin The Cartridge Researcher was published, written by Emile Timmermans. The Bulletinen has always been published with English as its main language, but has also been translated. Today there are five language groups within ECRA, which covers English, French, Spanish, German and Dutch. The Cartridge Researcher bulletin is published monthly.

On 20 September 1980, Norwegian and Swedish cartridge collectors met in the town of Grums in Sweden and agreed that a Scandinavian organization should be to established. This led to the Scandinavian Ammunition Research Association (SARA) which was formally founded on 22 August 1981 in the city of Arvika in Sweden. SARA today has increased its activity to also include collectors from Denmark, Finland and Iceland, and as such acts as the Nordic branch of ECRA.

Independently from ECRA, the U.S. based International Ammunition Association (IAA) was founded in 1955.

Resources 
ECRA edits the ECRA Caliber Data Viewer (ECDV) which is regarded as one of the most important cartridge identification databases in the world, with more than  registered small caliber cartridges up to 50 mm.

Member associations 
 Argentinian Collectors Association
 Czech and Slovak Ammunition Collectors Association
 Dutch Association for Research of Ammunition and Ballistics
 German Research Association for Ammunition
 Italian Cartridge Collectors Association
 New Zealand Cartridge Collectors Club
 Scandinavian Ammunition Research Association is the Nordic branch of ECRA, and represents collectors from Norway, Denmark, Sweden, Finland and Iceland. SARA publishes a member magazine called the Bulletin.
 Portuguese Collectors Association
 Southern Africa Arms and Ammunition Collectors Association
 Spanish Cartridge Collectors Association
 Swiss subdivision of the German Research Association for Ammunition

See also 
 International Cartridge Collectors Association
 Air travel with firearms and ammunition
 CIP, a European standardization organization for firearm cartridges
 SAAMI, an American standardization organization for firearm cartridges

References

External links 
 IAA - International Ammunition Association
 IAA Web Forum
 ECRA - European Cartridge Research Association
 Asociación Española de Coleccionistas de Cartuchos (AECC), responsible for Spanish language group of ECRA
 Nederlanse Vereniging ter Bestudering van Munitie en Ballistiek (NVBMB), responsible for Dutch language group of ECRA
 German Research Association for Ammunition, responsible for German language group of ECRA
 MSELECT, at tool for cataloging cartridge collections
 Cartridgecollector.net
 Bibliography of Books on Cartridges or Ammunition

Ammunition
Shooting sports organizations